Southtown, Southtowns or South Town may refer to:

"Southtown" (song), from the 2000 rap metal album The Fundamental Elements of Southtown by P.O.D.
Southtowns, a suburban region in Buffalo, New York
SouthtownStar, formerly the Daily Southtown, a newspaper in suburban Chicago
South Town, setting of Rankin/Bass Animated Entertainment's animated Christmas Special The Year Without a Santa Claus
South Town, setting of SNK Playmore's fighting video game series Fatal Fury and Art of Fighting
 South Town, one of the two municipalities that merged to form Pleasureville, Kentucky
Southtown, the near south side of San Antonio, Texas
Southtown Center, a shopping center in Bloomington, Minnesota